The Fort Bend County Toll Road Authority (FBCTRA), also called the Fort Bend Grand Parkway Toll Road Authority (FBGPTRA), operates three toll roads in Fort Bend County and is headquartered at 1 Fluor Daniel Dr in Sugar Land in the U.S. state of Texas.

History 
FBCTRA was established in 1996.

The FBCTRA uses Harris County Toll Road Authority's EZ TAG system, which is interoperable with the following:
 TxTag issued by the Texas Department of Transportation.
 TollTag issued by the North Texas Tollway Authority.
 May 2017 - K-Tag issued by the Kansas Turnpike Authority.
 May 2019 - PikePass issued by the Oklahoma Turnpike Authority. 
 The authority has no current plans to accept any other tolling agencies tags.
 FBCTRA does not accept cash or offer a pay-by-mail option on its toll roads

Roadways

References 
Fort Bend County Toll Road Authority

Transportation in Houston
Transportation in Fort Bend County, Texas
Toll roads in Texas
Toll road authorities of the United States
County roads in Fort Bend County, Texas